first edition of the Kuwait Super Cup won by Al-Arabi, Goal scored by Khaled Khalaf.

References

External links
Kuwait League Fixtures and Results at FIFA
Kuwaiti Super Cup (Arabic)
xscores.com Kuwait 
goalzz.com - Super Cup
RSSSF.com - Kuwait - List of Champions

Super Cup
Kuwait Super Cup
Kuwait SC matches